"I Dreamed a Dream" is a song from the musical Les Misérables.

I Dreamed a Dream may also refer to:
 I Dreamed a Dream (album), an album by Susan Boyle
 I Dreamed a Dream (musical), a jukebox musical by Alan McHugh and Elaine C. Smith, based on the life of Susan Boyle
 I Dreamed a Dream: The Susan Boyle Story, a television program

See also
 Dream a Dream, a 2000 album by Charlotte Church